The CQA Four Mile Bridge spans the Big Horn River in Hot Springs County, Wyoming. The rigid 7-panel Pennsylvania through-truss was nominated for inclusion on the National Register of Historic Places as one of forty bridges throughout Wyoming that collectively illustrate steel truss construction, a technique of bridge design that has become obsolete since the mid-twentieth century. The bridge rests on concrete piers and abutments and is approached by two Warren pony trusses.

The Four Mile Bridge was placed on the National Register of Historic Places in 1985.

See also
List of bridges documented by the Historic American Engineering Record in Wyoming

References

External links
 at the National Park Service's NRHP database

Four Mile Bridge  at the Wyoming State Historic Preservation Office

Buildings and structures in Hot Springs County, Wyoming
Road bridges on the National Register of Historic Places in Wyoming
Transportation in Hot Springs County, Wyoming
Historic American Engineering Record in Wyoming
National Register of Historic Places in Hot Springs County, Wyoming
Steel bridges in the United States
Pennsylvania truss bridges in the United States